Hamdard Laboratories (Waqf) Bangladesh is the largest herbal (unani) pharmaceutical company in Bangladesh and it is managed by Islamic trust known as a Waqf board. It originated in India and today there are independent and separate operations in India and Pakistan. Hakim Md. Yousuf Harun Bhuiyan is the managing director of Hamdard Laboratories (Waqf) Bangladesh. Its Rooh Afza is a popular drink during Ramadan in South Asia.

History 
Hamdard Laboratories (Waqf) Bangladesh traces it origins to Hamdard India established in 1906 by Hakeem Hafiz Abdul Majeed. Majeed died in 1922 and his will mentioned the company be placed in Waqf management. Ham means friend and dard means pain in Persian so the name means companion of pain. In 1948, after the partition of India, his youngest son, Hakeem Mohammad Said established Hamdard Pakistan. He established and expanded the company in East Pakistan in 1953 and 1956 respectively. He opened up sales center in Chittagong and Dhaka. After the independence of Bangladesh in 1971, Hamdard Pakistan became Hamdard Laboratories (Waqf) Bangladesh.

Hamdard Laboratories (Waqf) Bangladesh operates a research institute. It spends its entire profits through Hamdard Foundation Bangladesh, its charitable wing. Hakim Md. Yousuf Harun Bhuiyan, who had joined the company in 1972, became the managing director in 1982. In 1989, Hakim Mohammad Yousuf Harun Bhuiyan established Hamdard Foundation Bangladesh. The foundation established Hamdard Unani Medical College and Hospital in 1990.

The headquarters are located in Hamdard Bhaban at 291/1 Sonargaon Road in Gulistan and a factory in Tejgaon. Hamdard Laboratories Bangladesh was established in 2004 and is located in Meghna Ghat, Sonargaon Upazila, Narayanganj District. It was inaugurated by Khandaker Mosharraf Hossain, Minister of Health and Family Welfare. In 2004 it provided relief materials to victims of flooding in Keraniganj and Manikganj. Hakim Mohammad Yousuf Harun Bhuiyan estimated the market of herbal medicine to be 1 billion taka in 2005.

Hakim Said Eastern Medical College & Hospital was established in 2008 by the Hamdard Foundation. It also established Rawshan Jahan Eastern Medical College and Hospital in the same year. it participated in the FOODEX Japan 2009. It established 15 medical camps in Chittagong on Victory Day. It is licensed by the Government of Bangladesh to produce herbal medicine.

In 2010, Hamdard Foundation Bangladesh established Hamdard Public College. It ran a health camp in Gaibandha District.

Hamdard Foundation Bangladesh established Hamdard University Bangladesh on 29 November 2012.

Hamdard Museum was established in January 2022. Hamdard signed a memorandum of understanding with University of Dhaka.

Institutes under Hamdard Foundation Bangladesh 

 Hamdard University Bangladesh
 Hamdard Laboratories Bangladesh
 Hakim Said Eastern Medical College & Hospital 
 Hamdard Unani Medical College and Hospital
 Rawshan Jahan Eastern Medical College and Hospital
 Hamdard Public College
 Hamdard Shamachar
 Hamdard TV
 Rooh Afza
 Hamdard Honey

Board of Trustee

References 

1972 establishments in Bangladesh
Organisations based in Dhaka
Health care companies established in 1972
Pharmaceutical companies of Bangladesh
Manufacturing companies based in Dhaka
Unani medicine organisations
Bangladeshi brands
Pharmaceutical companies established in 1972
Companies based in Dhaka
Ayurvedic companies